Adolfo Holley Urzúa (born in Talca; 1833—11 November 1914) was a Chilean general who served in the War of the Pacific and in the 1891 Chilean Civil War and held posts in the resulting government.

Holley embarked upon his military career in the Occupation of the Araucanía in the Arauco War. At the start of the War of the Pacific, he was commissioned as second in command of the regiment Esmeralda when it was created after the division of the older Carampangue in May 1879. Serving in this position, Holley fought in the Battle of Tacna. He was promoted to commander of the regiment when its prior commander, Santiago Amengual, was named chief of the First Division in the Lima Campaign. Holley fought in the Battle of Chorrillos (Battle of San Juan) and the Battle of Miraflores, where his regiment suffered heavy losses. After the capture of Lima and the Chilean occupation of Lima, he remained in Peru with the Esmeralda regiment, taking part in the Breña Campaign (Campaign of the Sierra).

On 27 May 1891, Holley was named Minister of War and Navy by the Revolutionary Junta loyal to Congress established in Iquique. He defended the post, defeating the presidential government's forces loyal to José Manuel Balmaceda. Meanwhile, Jorge Montt, a Congressional supporter, took over control of the Santiago Government Junta on September 20. Holley left the government upon Montt's assumption of the constitutional office of President and the start of the new government on 26 December 1891, ending the transitional wartime regime in which he had served.

Holley served as the Senior General and Inspector General of the Army, the commander-in-chief, from 1894-1900. Adolfo Holley died in Tacna on 11 November 1914.

References 

1833 births
1914 deaths
Chilean people of English descent
Chilean Roman Catholics
Chilean Ministers of Defense
Chilean Army generals
People from Talca
People of the Chilean Civil War of 1891 (Congresistas)